Maitra is a village, near Ramban town in Ramban district in the Indian union territory of Jammu and Kashmir. Maitra is beautiful village which is surrounded by green mountains.

References

Villages in Ramban district
Chenab Valley